Gene Rayburn (born Eugene Peter Jeljenic; December 22, 1917 – November 29, 1999) was an American radio and television personality. He is best known as the host of various editions of the American television game show Match Game for over two decades.

Early life
Rayburn was born in Christopher, Illinois, the younger of two children of Croatian immigrants Mary A. Hikec (August 14, 1897 – April 29, 1985) and Peter Pero Jeljenić (January 17, 1887 – December 26, 1918). In an episode of Match Game ‘74, Rayburn spoke Serbo-Croatian with a contestant, mentioning that his parents were born in what was then Yugoslavia. His father died when Rayburn was an infant. Mary moved her family to Chicago, where she met Milan Rubessa. After she married Rubessa on November 10, 1919, Rayburn took the name Eugene Rubessa. He had an elder brother, Alfred, who was killed when Rayburn was a child, and a younger half-brother, Milan Rubessa Jr.

Rayburn graduated from Lindblom Technical High School and attended Knox College. At Lindblom, he was senior class president and acted in the plays Robert of Sicily and Mrs. Wiggs of the Cabbage Patch.

An aspiring actor and opera singer, Rayburn moved to New York City but was unable to find stage work.  He found a job as a page and tour guide at NBC studios at 30 Rockefeller Plaza instead. After three years in that position, Rayburn began announcing at various radio stations, eventually landing back in New York at WNEW. He enlisted in the United States Army Air Forces and served in World War II. Gene chose the stage name "Rayburn" by randomly sticking his finger in the phone book.

Career

Radio career

Before appearing in television, Rayburn was an actor and radio performer. He had a morning drive time radio show in New York City, first with Jack Lescoulie (Anything Goes) and later with Dee Finch (Rayburn & Finch) on WNEW. Rayburn's pairings with Lescoulie and Finch helped to popularize the now-familiar morning drive radio format. At WNEW, he was able to lobby for songs' recording and, hence, chart-popularity, e.g. "Music! Music! Music!" (recorded by Teresa Brewer) and co-authoring the lyrics of the song "Hop-Scotch Polka" with Carl Sigman (both 1949). When Rayburn left WNEW, Dee Finch continued the format with Gene Klavan.

Stage career 
Rayburn took the lead role in the Broadway musical Bye Bye Birdie when Dick Van Dyke left the production to star in The Dick Van Dyke Show. At one point in his stage career, Rayburn's stand-in was future Match Game panelist Charles Nelson Reilly.

Television career
Breaking into television as the original announcer on Steve Allen's Tonight, Rayburn began a long association with game show producers Mark Goodson and Bill Todman in 1953. He first appeared on Robert Q. Lewis's The Name's the Same; Rayburn frequently sat in for regular panelist Carl Reiner. In 1955, he took over as host of the summer replacement game show Make the Connection from original host Jim McKay (and appearing with his WNEW morning show successor Gene Klavan). From there he hosted shows such as Choose Up Sides, Dough Re Mi, and the daytime version of Tic Tac Dough. On radio, Rayburn became one of the many hosts of the NBC program Monitor in 1961 and remained with the show until 1973.

In an uncredited role (he reportedly did not want his name to appear), Rayburn played a TV interviewer in the movie It Happened to Jane (1959) starring Doris Day. Rayburn was also a frequent panelist in the 1960s and 1970s on What's My Line? and To Tell the Truth.

Match Game

From 1962 to 1969, Rayburn hosted The Match Game. In the original version, which aired from New York on NBC, Rayburn read questions to two panels, each consisting of a celebrity and two audience members. The questions in the original game were ordinary, like "Name a kind of muffin," or "John loves his ." Rayburn usually played it straight, though he would make jokes as the situation warranted. Because it was a live show, very few episodes were recorded; only four are known to exist. The show was canceled in 1969 to make room for the topical, short-lived game show Letters to Laugh-In.

Goodson-Todman revived Match Game in 1973 for CBS, this time as a California-based game show. Rayburn returned as host and introduced a new format in which two contestants tried to match the responses of six celebrities. Writer Dick DeBartolo, a veteran of the original show, created funnier and often risqué questions ("After being hit by a steamroller, Norman had to slide his  under the door.") Rayburn reveled in this freewheeling new approach and often indulged in funny voices, banter with the celebrities, and mock arguments with the technical crew. It soon became the highest-rated show on daytime television.

From 1973 to 1977, Match Game was number one among all daytime network game shows—three of those years it was the highest rated of all daytime shows. The daytime revival of Match Game, which featured regular panelists Richard Dawson, Brett Somers, and Charles Nelson Reilly, ran until 1979 on CBS and another three years in first-run syndication. A concurrent nighttime version, Match Game PM, aired in syndication from 1975 to 1981. Rayburn was nominated for three Daytime Emmy Award for Outstanding Game Show Host.

During the years when Match Game was taped in Los Angeles (1973–1982), Rayburn lived in Osterville, Massachusetts on Cape Cod. He commuted to California every two weeks to tape 12 shows over the course of a weekend (five daytime shows and one nighttime show per taping day).

In 1983, a year after the syndicated Match Game ended, the show was revived as part of the Match Game-Hollywood Squares Hour. Rayburn hosted the Match Game and "Super Match" segments and sat on the panel for the Hollywood Squares segment, which was hosted by Jon Bauman. This show lasted nine months on NBC. Rayburn, by most accounts, was disappointed with how the show turned out.

Other game shows and television appearances

During and between his Match Game years, Rayburn served as guest panelist on two other Goodson-Todman shows: What's My Line? and To Tell the Truth. Also during the run of the 1970s Match Game, Rayburn and his wife Helen appeared on the game show Tattletales, hosted by Bert Convy. Rayburn also hosted some episodes of Tattletales. Three years after the original Match Game was canceled, Rayburn hosted the short-lived Heatter-Quigley Productions show The Amateur's Guide to Love. In 1983, he hosted a pilot for Reg Grundy Productions titled Party Line, which later became Bruce Forsyth's Hot Streak.

In 1980, Rayburn was a guest star on the television show The Love Boat. Rayburn appeared as a contestant during a tournament of game show hosts on the original version of Card Sharks in 1980 and was a celebrity guest on Password Plus several times between 1980 and 1982. He appeared on Fantasy Island as a game show host—he and another host played by Jan Murray were game show rivals who vied to win the woman they both loved by creating the ultimate game show, with life-or-death consequences. He once hosted a local New York City show on WNEW-TV, Helluva Town, and between game show stints in 1982–1983, he returned to WNEW-TV as host of a weekly talk and lifestyles show titled Saturday Morning Live. He ended his brief tenure to return as co-host of Match Game-Hollywood Squares Hour.

Rayburn's last game show hosting duties were on 1985's Break the Bank (he was replaced by Joe Farago after 13 weeks), and The Movie Masters, an AMC game show that ran from 1989 to 1990. Just before production was to begin on a new Rayburn-emceed Match Game revival in 1987, an Entertainment Tonight reporter publicly disclosed that Rayburn was 69 years old, much older than many believed. Rayburn had trouble finding jobs after that, blaming the reporter for revealing his age and subjecting him to age discrimination. His daughter Lynne blamed this, and the subsequent lack of work he received, for sending him into a downward spiral.

Rayburn portrayed himself on a Saturday Night Live sketch in 1990, which featured Susan Lucci (as her character from All My Children, Erica Kane). He returned as one of Kane's many previous husbands, to stop another marriage (officiated by his old Choose Up Sides co-star Don Pardo) with the host of a game show portrayed by Phil Hartman. He also continued to make appearances on talk shows throughout the late 1980s and 1990s, usually to discuss classic game shows, including appearances on Vicki! and The Maury Povich Show and The Late Show with Ross Shafer (Shafer hosted the 1990 Match Game revival). In 1992, Rayburn also made an appearance on New York shock jock Howard Stern's late-night TV variety show as one of the stars of his Hollywood Squares parody, Homeless Howiewood Squares, in which homeless people were supposedly the contestants.

Rayburn co-hosted—with his wife and Peter Emmons—the Drum Corps International finals of the DCI Championship for two years, which were telecast on PBS from Philadelphia's Franklin Field in 1976 and Denver's original Mile High Stadium in 1977.

Personal life and death
Rayburn was married to Helen Ticknor from 1940 until her death in October 1996. They had one child, a daughter. 

One of Rayburn’s last TV appearances was a 1998 interview with Access Hollywood intended to coincide with the 25th anniversary of Match Game '73. Portions of the interview have been rebroadcast on Game Show Network, which in 2001 showed portions of another previously unaired interview during the first airing of its Match Game Blankathon.

Rayburn identified as a liberal politically and was a supporter of Planned Parenthood. Rayburn was also concerned that human overpopulation would become an issue in the 21st century and that it would become more difficult to supply resources such as food if the population grew too large. He expressed these concerns when he appeared on Game Show Hosts week on Card Sharks in 1980, where he played for Planned Parenthood as his favorite charity.

Rayburn enjoyed needlepoint and did it regularly on his many flights to and from California. He took it up when he knitted socks as a gag on Rayburn and Finch. Mark Goodson presented him with a needlepoint kit on the air as a gift when Match Game became the number one show on daytime television.

Though in poor health and suffering from dementia, Rayburn appeared in person to accept a Lifetime Achievement Award from the Academy of Television Arts & Sciences. A month later, on November 29, 1999, he died of heart failure at his daughter's home in Gloucester, Massachusetts, at age 81, 24 days shy of his 82nd birthday. He was cremated and his ashes spread in the garden of his daughter's home.

Rayburn's final TV appearance was in an interview for the A&E Biography episode profiling the life of his longtime boss Mark Goodson; though taped in late 1999, the episode did not air until June 4, 2000, several months after Rayburn had died.

Filmography

References

External links

 
 
  Rayburn hosts NBC Monitor radio program (audio files)

1917 births
1999 deaths
People from Christopher, Illinois
American game show hosts
American people of Croatian descent
Knox College (Illinois) alumni
American male stage actors
American male musical theatre actors
20th-century American male actors
Male actors from Chicago
United States Army Air Forces personnel of World War II
20th-century American male singers
20th-century American singers
Robert Lindblom Math & Science Academy alumni